Dallas Wise (born 14 December 2000) is an American Paralympic high jumper. He made his maiden Paralympic appearance representing United States at the 2020 Summer Paralympics.

Career 
He became the first Coastal Carolina University alumni to compete at the Paralympics.

He claimed silver medal in the men's high jump T47 category at the 2020 Summer Paralympics. He incredibly shared the silver medal with Nishad Kumar of India who also cleared the same distance of 2.06m. As a result, bronze medal was not awarded to any of the athletes who competed in the high jump T47 category for men.

References 

2000 births
Living people
American male high jumpers
Paralympic silver medalists for the United States
Athletes (track and field) at the 2020 Summer Paralympics
Paralympic medalists in athletics (track and field)
Medalists at the 2020 Summer Paralympics
Coastal Carolina University alumni